Phalacra is a genus of moths belonging to the subfamily Drepaninae. The genus was erected by Francis Walker in 1866.

Species
Phalacra acutipennis Swinhoe, 1903
Phalacra buchsbaumi Holloway, 1998
Phalacra columba Holloway, 1998
Phalacra kagiensis Wileman, 1916
Phalacra strigata Warren, 1896
Phalacra vidhisara (Walker, 1860)
Phalacra excisa Hampson, 1892
Phalacra ochrea Warren, 1922
Phalacra rufa Hampson, 1910
Phalacra albilinea Warren, 1899
Phalacra nigrilineata Warren, 1922
Phalacra perspicaria (Fabricius, 1798)

Former species
Phalacra metagonaria Walker, 1866
Phalacra multilineata Warren, 1897

References

Drepaninae
Drepanidae genera